The Lytham Festival (formerly and colloquially Lytham Proms) is an annual five-day music festival held in Lytham St Annes, Lancashire. The festival takes place adjacent to Lytham Windmill on Lytham Green, a strip of grass between the town's coastal road and the River Ribble estuary. In promotion and ticketing, festival organisers refer to the venue as "The Proms Arena". It is usually held in mid-July, with the final night often featuring an evening of orchestral classical music, in the style of a traditional promenade concert. Lytham Festival first took place in 2009, and is operated by Lancashire-based promoter Cuffe & Taylor, owned by Live Nation UK. The festival typically has a capacity of 20,000.

Festivals

2010

Lytham Proms 2010 was a one-day picnic event held on 21 August 2010, and featured Lesley Garrett accompanied by the Manchester Camerata.

2011

Lytham Proms 2011 took place between 5 August 2012 and 7 August 2012. The event featured headline acts Status Quo, Katherine Jenkins and Boyzone. Unlike previous years, the 2011 festival was held over three nights instead of being a one-day event.

2012

Lytham Proms 2012 took place between 3 August 2012 and 5 August 2012.

2013

Lytham Proms 2013 took place between 2 August 2013 and 4 August 2013.

2014

Lytham Proms 2014 took place between 1 August 2014 and 3 August 2014.

2015

Lytham Festival 2015 took place between 6 August 2015 and 9 August 2015. It was the first festival to be branded under the "Lytham Festival" name, as Cuffe & Taylor wanted to depart from the promenade concert theme and incorporate acts other than classical artists.

2016

Lytham Festival 2016 took place between 4 August 2017 and 7 August 2017. American band Earth, Wind & Fire were originally set to perform alongside The Village People, however their appearance was cancelled. Group Sister Sledge were chosen to replace Earth, Wind & Fire.

2017

Lytham Festival 2017 took place between 2 August 2017 and 6 August 2017.

2018

Lytham Festival 2018 took place between 18 July 2018 and 22 July 2018.

2019

Lytham Festival 2019 took place between 10 July 2019 and 14 July 2019, and was the 10th anniversary of the festival.

2020 and 2021

Lytham Festival 2020 was originally announced in late 2019, with the headline acts being Westlife, Lewis Capaldi, Snow Patrol, Lionel Richie and Little Mix. In April 2020, the event was confirmed to be cancelled due to the COVID-19 pandemic in England.

Lytham Festival 2021 was originally announced in late 2020, with the headline acts being Lewis Capaldi, Snow Patrol, Lionel Richie and Duran Duran. On March 26, 2021, the festival was announced to be cancelled due to the COVID-19 pandemic, with organisers confirming that the headline acts would be rebooked for Lytham Festival 2022.

2022

In July 2021, Fylde Borough Council granted the tournament organisers a "one year only" license to run Lytham Festival for ten nights in 2022, rather than the usual five nights. This was due to the 2020 and 2021 festivals being canceled due to the COVID-19 pandemic. The full lineup for Lytham Festival 2022 was confirmed in March 2022. The festival ran from 28 June 2022 to 10 July 2022.

In February 2022, Lionel Richie pulled out of the festival, and was replaced with Nile Rodgers & Chic. On 29 June, Lytham Festival announced that Kodaline had withdrawn from supporting Snow Patrol and were to be replaced by Maxïmo Park. On 9 July 2022, a few hours before their performance, headliners Tears for Fears withdrew from the festival due to Curt Smith "injuring his rib". Opening acts Natalie Imbruglia and Alison Moyet still performed.

2023

Lytham Festival 2023 is set to take place between 28 June 2023 and 2 July 2023. The first acts were announced on 20 October 2022, a co-headlining performance by rock bands Mötley Crüe and Def Leppard to take plae on the final night of the festival.

Notes

References

External links
 Official festival website

Lytham St Annes
2009 establishments in England
Music festivals in Lancashire
Pop music festivals in the United Kingdom